Diaper Genie, a creation of entrepreneur John Hall, is a baby diaper disposal system. The unit consists of a large plastic container with a plastic lid. The system seals diapers individually in a scented film to protect against germs and odors. By opening the lid on the top of the canister, a soiled diaper may be inserted into the "mouth" of the container. After inserting the diaper, the lid is replaced and twisted three full rotations to seal the diaper inside. After the container is filled with dirty diapers, it can be emptied by unlatching the bottom of the canister, where the diapers fall out still individually sealed. The resulting string of sealed diapers is colloquially known as a "diaper sausage".

The product was initially a creation of British inventors (currently marketed under the name "Sangenic" by Mayborn in the UK), while Hall brought the Genie to prominence in the US in the mid 1990s. 

Diaper Genie is a brand of Playtex Products, Inc., which bought the Diaper Genie business from Mondial Industries L.P. in 1999.

References

External links
 

Diapers
Waste containers